Dapur Devina is a cooking show presented by an Indonesian chef, writer, and cooking instructor, Devina Hermawan, more closely known as Chef Devina.

The first episode of Dapur Devina was aired on March 12, 2022, and will be subsequently broadcast every Saturday at 10.30 WIB on TVRI. Dapur Devina will present various menus and recipes from different regions in Indonesia. Dapur Devina is Chef Devina’s first cooking program on television. Presently, Chef Devina has completed the shoot for 30 episodes for season 1 & 2.

Host 

 Devina Hermawan

Episodes

Season 1

Season 2

References

External links 
 
 

TVRI original programming
Indonesian-language television shows